El Hombre Caimán (The Alligator Man) is a legend from the Caribbean coast of Colombia that takes place in the riverside town of Plato: Saúl Montenegro’s passion for spying on naked women turned into a being with the head of a man and the body of an alligator.

Montenegro liked to watch the women who bathed in the waters of the Magdalena River but feared being caught watching from among the trees. He went to a witch in Alta Guajira for a potion to turn himself into an alligator so that the bathers would not suspect him and he could admire them as much as he wished. The witch gave him two potions: a red one that turned him into an alligator, and a white one that turned him back. Montenegro enjoyed this for some time.

On one occasion, the friend who often accompanied him with the white potion could not come. In his place another man came and this man, when he saw him in his alligator form, became frightened and dropped the bottle of white potion that would make him a man again. Most of it spilled, but some of the liquid splashed on Saúl's head, and his head changed back but his body remained that of an alligator.

After this, women were too afraid to bathe in the river. Only his mother dared approach him. Every night she came to the river to comfort him, and bring him his favorite foods: cheese, cassava (yucca), and bread soaked in rum. His mother eventually died of sadness, unable to find the witch who had made the potions.

Alligator Man was left alone, with no-one to take care of him. He decided to let the river carry him out to sea at Bocas de Ceniza the mouth of the Magdalena River, near Barranquilla. Since then, the fishermen of the lower Magdalena, from Plato to Bocas de Ceniza, still hunt for him in the river and the swampy riverbanks.

A festival of Alligator Man is held annually in Plato. A square and a monument have been built in his honor and are part of the local cultural heritage. His legend is immortalized in the song "Se va el caimán" by Barranquilla musician .

References

Colombian folklore
Myths and legends of Colombia
Caribbean region of Colombia
Human-headed mythical creatures
South American mythology
Spanish-language South American legendary creatures
Legendary reptiles
Mythological human hybrids